The 2007 Rotterdam Sprint Cup was held from 4 to 9 January 2007 in Rotterdam Ahoy Sportpaleis in Rotterdam. The event was held for the first time and scheduled together with the 2007 Six Days of Rotterdam. Six of the world's best track sprint cyclists challenged each other in several sprint disciplines over six days, resulting in a total ranking.

Day 1

Day 2

Day 3

Day 4

Day 5

Day 6

Discipline rankings

External links
 Official website

Rotterdam Sprint Cup
Rotterdam Sprint Cup
International cycle races hosted by the Netherlands